The 2016–17 Kentucky Wildcats men's basketball team represented the University of Kentucky in the 2016–17 NCAA Division I men's basketball season. The team played its home games in Lexington, Kentucky for the 41st consecutive season at Rupp Arena, with a capacity of 23,500.  The team, led by John Calipari in his eighth season as head coach, is a member of the Southeastern Conference.

Departures

2016–17 Newcomers

Edrice Adebayo, nicknamed "Bam" and originally from Pinetown, North Carolina, was a consensus top 15 player in his class. He committed to Kentucky on November 17, live on ESPN's Mike & Mike simulcast radio show. He chose Kentucky over NC State and Auburn. He is ranked in the top 10 by Rivals (No. 6) and ESPN (No. 6). 247Sports (No. 14) and Scout (No. 15) tab him as a top-15 prospect in the 2016 class. He has prior USA Basketball experience and was named a MaxPreps All-American in 2013.

De'Aaron Fox, originally from Katy, Texas, was the second highest rated point guard that Calipari had signed at Kentucky. He committed to Kentucky on November 12, live on ESPNU. He chose Kentucky over Kansas, Louisville, and LSU. He was the nation's consensus top point guard, was ranked the consensus No. 3 overall player by the four main recruiting services Rivals, ESPN, Scout, and 247 Sports.

Wenyen Gabriel, originally from Manchester, New Hampshire, was the third commitment in the Kentucky class. He committed to Kentucky on October 1, live on the radio. He chose Kentucky over Connecticut, Duke, and Maryland. He was a consensus five star prospect, and was ranked the consensus No. 17 overall player by the four main recruiting services Rivals, ESPN, Scout, and 247 Sports.

Sacha Killeya-Jones, originally from Chapel Hill, North Carolina, was the second commitment in the Kentucky class. He committed to Kentucky on October 1, live on the radio. He chose Kentucky over Connecticut, North Carolina, and Virginia. He was a consensus four star prospect, and was ranked the consensus No. 36 overall player by the four main recruiting services Rivals, ESPN, Scout, and 247 Sports.

Malik Monk, originally from Lepanto, Arkansas but attending high school in Bentonville, Arkansas, was the second highest rated shooting guard that Calipari signed at Kentucky. He committed to Kentucky on November 18. He chose Kentucky over Arkansas where his brother, Marcus Monk, played college basketball and football. He was a consensus five star prospect, and was ranked the consensus No. 5 overall player by the four main recruiting services Rivals, ESPN, Scout, and 247 Sports.

Pre-season

Roster
On April 1 the University of Kentucky held a press conference for Murray as he declared himself eligible for the 2016 NBA draft, and would forgo his remaining eligibility by signing with an agent. On April 5 Labissiere declared himself eligible for the draft, and would forgo his remaining eligibility by signing with an agent. On April 6 the University of Kentucky held a press conference for Ulis as he declared himself eligible for the draft, and would forgo his remaining eligibility by signing with an agent. On May 18 Matthews announced that he would transfer from Kentucky and finish his remaining three years of eligibility at a school that was to be chosen; the following month, Matthews announced that he would go to Michigan. On May 25 Briscoe and Lee withdrew their names from the draft, but Lee decided to transfer for his final year of eligibility to a then-undetermined school, which ultimately proved to be California. On August 9, reserve guard E. J. Floréal announced that he would leave the UK basketball program to compete full-time for the school in track. Floréal, who had one year of remaining eligibility in basketball but would have two years in track, was a local and regional track champion in high school, and his father was UK's head track coach at the time.

Accolades and rankings
The Southeastern Conference preseason media poll was released at the SEC Media Days in October, it predicted that Kentucky would win the championship. Adebayo and Fox were named to the All-SEC First Team while Briscoe and Monk were named to the All-SEC Second Team.

USA Today announced its initial coaches poll on October 15 with Kentucky ranked as No. 4 in the country. The Associated Press announced on October 31 that Kentucky was ranked No. 2 to start the season in its initial poll of the season.

Events
On July 18 Kentucky released the non-conference portion of its schedule. The schedule is highlighted by marquee match-ups at Rupp Arena and across the country. Kentucky will travel to New York to play Michigan State in the annual Champions Classic, to the Bahamas to play Arizona State, back to New York to play Hofstra, to Las Vegas to play against North Carolina in the annual CBS Sports Classic, and finally to Louisville to face in-state rival Louisville.. Kentucky will also host UCLA for the first time as well as Kansas in the Big 12/SEC Challenge.

Tickets for Big Blue Madness, Kentucky's version of Midnight Madness went on sale and sold out on September 30.

Big Blue Madness took place on October 14. The event debuted the team for the 2016–17 season. It included player introductions, a speech by Calipari, and a scrimmage.

2017–18 newcomers
Nick Richards, a native of Kingston, Jamaica living in Queens, New York, was the first commitment in the Kentucky class. He committed to Kentucky on November 10 at a press conference at his high school. He chose Kentucky over Arizona and Syracuse. He was a consensus five star prospect, and was ranked the consensus No. 14 overall player by the four main recruiting services.

P. J. Washington, a Dallas native attending school in Las Vegas, Nevada, was the second commitment in the Kentucky class. He committed to Kentucky on November 10 live on ESPNU. He chose Kentucky over North Carolina and UNLV. He was a consensus five star prospect, and was ranked the consensus No. 15 overall player by the four main recruiting services.

Shai Gilgeous-Alexander, originally from Hamilton, Ontario and attending school in Chattanooga, Tennessee, was the third commitment in the Kentucky class.  He committed to Kentucky on November 14 through a message on Twitter.  He was a consensus top fifty player, ranked No. 42 by the four main recruiting services Rivals, ESPN, Scout, and 24/7 Sports.

Quade Green, from Philadelphia, Pennsylvania, was the fourth commitment in the Kentucky class. He signed his National Letter of Intent on November 16, the last day of the early signing period, but did not reveal his choice between Kentucky and Syracuse until an event at his high school on November 19 - with his mother Tamika Johnson by his side. He was a consensus top-25 player and ranked as a five-star player by the four main recruiting services Rivals, ESPN, Scout, and 24/7 Sports.

Hamidou Diallo, a Queens native who graduated from a Connecticut school in spring 2016, announced on January 7, 2017 that he would enroll at UK for the start of the school's spring semester the following week. While he was eligible to play immediately, he redshirted the spring semester and is set to begin play as a freshman in 2017–18.

Jemarl Baker, a native of Eastvale, California, was the seventh commitment in the Kentucky recruiting class. He announced his decision on April 11 via a story posted on Scout.com by Evan Daniels. Baker originally committed to Cuonzo Martin at California, before Martin left the school to coach Missouri. He averaged 17.1 points, 4.1 assists, 3.5 rebounds and 1.8 steals for Roosevelt High School in Corona, Calif., and he quickly emerged as one of the Wildcats' top backcourt targets after their season ended last month. Scout.com ranks Baker as the No. 86 overall prospect in the 2017 class.

UK's final commitment came on May 6, when Tampa product Kevin Knox announced he would come to the school. Kentucky beat out Duke, Florida State, North Carolina, and Missouri for Knox's signature.

Roster

Roster is subject to change as/if players transfer or leave the program for other reasons.

Depth chart

Schedule and results

|-
!colspan=12 style=| Exhibition

|-
!colspan=12 style=| Regular Season

|-
!colspan=12 style=|SEC Tournament

|-
!colspan=12 style=| NCAA tournament

Honors

Weekly Awards
On November 14 Fox was named SEC Freshman of the Week following a 21-point career-high against Canisius and a 12-assist career-high against Stephen F. Austin.

National Awards
On March 28, 2017 Malik Monk was voted consensus Second Team All-American by each of the NCAA's four recognized organizations (AP, National Association of Basketball Coaches, United States Basketball Writers Association, Sporting News) it uses to determine consensus status. On April 7, 2017, Malik Monk won the Jerry West Award, which is awarded to the nation's top shooting guard of the year. Monk beat out Duke's Luke Kennard, UCLA's Bryce Alford, and Creighton's Marcus Foster for the award.

Rankings

References

Kentucky
Kentucky Wildcats men's basketball seasons
Kentucky
Kentucky
Kentucky